TV Shit is an EP by American alternative rock band Sonic Youth and Japanese vocalist Yamatsuka Eye. It was released in 1994 by Thurston Moore's record label Ecstatic Peace.

Content 

TV Shit is a series of covers, all of the same track: Washington, D.C. hardcore punk band Youth Brigade's song "No Song II". The original version was a one-second song consisting of the spoken word "no".

The album cover's spine and back cover (with the exception of the photo) were from the Karlheinz Stockhausen album Gesang der Jünglinge, which is often credited as being the first electronic album.

Critical reception 

Brian Flota of AllMusic called the EP "a fun, throwaway exercise" and "a must for all Sonic Youth fans, and it will alienate just about everyone else".

Track listing

Personnel 

 Sonic Youth

Additional personnel

 J. Mascis ("No II (Part 1)")
 Mark Arm ("No II (Part 1)")

References

External links 

 
 Trouser Press article on Sonic Youth which mentions the EP

1993 EPs
Sonic Youth EPs
Ecstatic Peace! EPs